Homebrew is a free and open-source software package management system that simplifies the installation of software on Apple's operating system, macOS, as well as Linux. The name is intended to suggest the idea of building software on the Mac depending on the user's taste. Originally written by Max Howell, the package manager has gained popularity in the Ruby on Rails community and earned praise for its extensibility. Homebrew has been recommended for its ease of use as well as its integration into the command-line interface. Homebrew is a non-profit project member of the Software Freedom Conservancy, and is run entirely by unpaid volunteers.

Homebrew has made extensive use of GitHub to expand the support of several packages through user contributions. In 2010, Homebrew was the third-most-forked repository on GitHub. In 2012, Homebrew had the largest number of new contributors on GitHub. In 2013, Homebrew had both the largest number of contributors and issues closed of any project on GitHub.

Homebrew has spawned several sub-projects such as Linuxbrew, a Linux port now officially merged into Homebrew; Homebrew Cask, which builds upon Homebrew and focuses on the installation of GUI applications; and "taps" dedicated to specific areas or programming languages like PHP.

History
Homebrew was written by Max Howell in 2009. In March 2013, Homebrew successfully completed a Kickstarter campaign to raise funds for servers to test and build formulae and managed to raise . On December 13, 2013, the Homebrew repository migrated from Howell's GitHub account to its own project account. In February 2015, due to downtime at SourceForge which resulted in binaries being unavailable, Homebrew moved their hosting to Bintray. On September 21, 2016, Homebrew version 1.0.0 was released. As of February 2021, Homebrew is maintained by a team of 34 people. In January 2019, Linuxbrew was merged back into Homebrew, adding beta support for Linux and the Windows Subsystem for Linux to the Homebrew feature set. On February 2, 2019, Homebrew version 2.0.0 was released. On September 21, 2020, Homebrew version 2.5.2 was released with support for bottle taps (binary package repositories) via GitHub Releases. Version 3.0.0 was released almost exactly two years after 2.0.0, on February 5, 2021, and added official support for Macs with Apple silicon. On April 12, 2021, Homebrew version 3.1.0 was released completing their migration of bottles (binary packages) to GitHub Packages before the May 1, 2021 shutdown of Bintray as previously announced by JFrog.

Implementation
Homebrew is written in the Ruby programming language and targets the version of Ruby that comes installed with the macOS operating system. By default, it is installed into /usr/local on Intel-based machines and /opt/homebrew on Apple silicon. The installation consists of a git repository that allows users to update Homebrew by pulling an updated repository from GitHub. The package manager builds software from source using "formulae", Ruby scripts constructed with the Homebrew domain-specific language (DSL) for managing dependencies, downloading source files, and configuring and compiling software. Binary packages called "bottles" provide pre-built formulae with default options.

Homebrew does not honor the default privileges of /usr/local; directory ownership is changed from root with group permissions for the wheel group to the installing user and the "admin" group. Specifically, the mode changes from drwxr-xr-x root wheel to  drwxrwxr-x myuser admin. All files, not just the directories, have their ownership changed by the installer. This is considered by some as a major security flaw.

Data collection
Homebrew collects installation, build error, and operating system version statistics via Google Analytics. It is possible to opt out with the command brew analytics off.

Users can view analytics data from the last 30, 90, and 365 days on the Homebrew website.

See also

 Fink
 Gentoo/Alt
 MacPorts
 Nix
 Pkgsrc
 FreeBSD Ports
 Installer (macOS)
 List of software package management systems

References

External links
 
 
 "The Changelog #223: Homebrew and Package Management with Mike McQuaid". 2016-10-07.

2009 software
Console applications
Free package management systems
Free software programmed in Ruby
Software using the BSD license
Utilities for Linux
Utilities for macOS